This page lists notable alumni and faculty of the University of California, Santa Cruz; alumni may have attended without graduating.

Notable alumni

Academia
William Drea Adams – President of Colby College, Waterville, Maine
 Michelle Anderson, B.A. 1989 – (born 1967) – President of Brooklyn College, and a scholar on rape law
 Stefano Bloch, B.A. 2001 - Author, graffiti artist, and professor of cultural geography at the University of Arizona
Hume A Feldman, BA 1984 –  Professor and Chair, Department of Physics & Astronomy, University of Kansas, APS Fellow
Gabriel Filippelli, Ph.D, 1994 - biogeochemist and climate change researcher, IUPUI
 Yoav Freund, Ph.D. 1994 – professor of computer science at the University of California San Diego, winner of the Gödel prize
Kristen R. Ghodsee, B.A. 1993 – Professor of Gender and Women's Studies at Bowdoin College; winner of 2012 Guggenheim Fellowship
Alexander Gonzalez, Ph.D. 1979 – President of California State University, Sacramento
Thyrza Nichols Goodeve, artist and writer, School of Visual Arts 
Victor Davis Hanson, B.A. 1975 – historian, Professor Emeritus of Classics at California State University, Fresno; Hoover Institution Fellow; 2007 National Humanities Medal recipient
Eva Simone Hayward, Women's Studies researcher on faculty at University of Arizona 
Caren Kaplan, Ph.D. – Professor of American Studies at UC Davis
Steven G. Krantz, B.A – Professor of Mathematics at Washington University in St. Louis; winner of the Chauvenet Prize
Andrew Jolivette; Ph.D. – Professor of Ethnic Studies, senior specialist Native American and Indigenous Studies at University of California, San Diego
Annette Lareau, B.A. 1974 – Professor of Sociology at University of Pennsylvania
Lisa Lowe, Ph.D. – Professor of American Studies at Yale
Patricia Nelson Limerick – Professor of History at University of Colorado and a leading historian of the American West
Tod Machover – MIT Media Lab
Austin E. Quigley, Ph.D. – Dean of Columbia College of Columbia University
John R. Rickford, B.A. 1971 – Professor of Linguistics at Stanford University and African American Vernacular English or Ebonics expert
Sally Sedgwick, B.A. 1978 – Distinguished Professor of Philosophy at University of Illinois at Chicago
Jeffrey C. Stewart, B.A. 1971 – Professor of Black Studies at University of California, Santa Barbara
Bret Weinstein, B.A. – American biologist and evolutionary theorist

Arts and letters
Will Bagley, BA 1971 – historian of 1800s American West
Michael A. Bellesiles, BA 1975 – author of a book "Arming America: The origins of a National Gun Culture" which won the Bancroft Prize in 2001; the prize was rescinded by Columbia University in 2002 as for having "violated basic norms of scholarship and the high standards expected of Bancroft Prize winners." 
Susie Bright – writer, sex activist and sex therapy focus leader
Gail Carriger, MA 2008 – steampunk author
Maya Chinchilla, BA 2000 – Guatemalan-American poet 
Fred Cohen, BA 1980 — Director of the School of Music & Dance, San Jose State University
David Farley- BA 1995 – Author of "An Irreverent Curiosity", food and travel writer
William Finnegan- BA 1974 – 2016 Pulitzer prize author of "Barbarian Days", journalist
Laurie Garrett, BA 1975 – Newsday science reporter and author, Pulitzer Prize winner
Philip Kan Gotanda – playwright
Reyna Grande, BA 1999 – author, American Book Award winner
Kira Lynn Harris, MFA 1998 – artist
bell hooks, PhD 1983 – feminist social critic 
Miranda July – filmmaker and writer
Lori Kay, BA 1986 – artist, sculptor
Persis Karim, BA 1985 – poet, editor, educator, scholar of Iranian-Americans
Jayne Ann Krentz, BA 1970 – New York Times bestselling author
Katerina Lanfranco, BA 2001 – artist
Deborah Madison, BA 1968 – cookbook author, founding chef of the Greens Restaurant
Steve Martini, BA 1968 – bestselling mysteries author
Lou Mathews, BA 1973 – writer, "Best Book" of 1999 for L.A. Breakdown (L.A. Times)
Omar Musa – award-winning Australian author, poet and rapper
Kent Nagano, BA 1974 – conductor of the Los Angeles Opera and the Montreal Symphony Orchestra
Jenny Parks – comics artist, fan artist, and scientific illustrator
Larry Polansky, BA – composer
Johanna Poethig, BA 1980 – visual, public and performance artist
Dana Priest, BA 1981 – Washington Post reporter and author; winner of the 2006 Pulitzer Prize for Beat Reporting and 2008 Pulitzer Prize for Public Service
Tanya Ragir, BA 1976 – artist 
Tlaloc Rivas, BA 1995 – theatre director, writer, and professor
Joe Safdie, BA 1975 - poet
Michael Schennum, BA 2000 – photojournalist
Andrea Smith, PhD 2002 – Cherokee activist and author
David Talbot, BA – founder of Salon.com, author, journalist
Mark Teague, BA 1985 – author and illustrator of children's books
Hector Tobar, BA – Los Angeles Times columnist, author, winner of Pulitzer Prize in 1992
Bernt Wahl, BA 1984, BS 1986 – author and entrepreneur, Fulbright Fellow. November 1985 coined UC Santa Cruz motto "Fiat Slug"
Annie Wells, BA 1981 – photographer, filmmaker, winner of Pulitzer Prize for Spot News Photography in 1997
Lawrence Weschler, 1974 – author
Richard White – historian of American West, Native American history, and environmental history; MacArthur Foundation fellowship, 1995
Daniel James Wolf, BA 1983 – composer
Laurence Yep – author

Business

Mike Hilton - Co-founder of  Concur Technologies which is now SAP Concur.
Lee Holloway - Co-founder of Cloudflare
Bo Hong, PhD - Founding Engineer of Pure Storage
Shel Kaphan - Employee no.1 of Amazon, former CTO and VP at Amazon 
Jonah Peretti, BS 1996 – founder of BuzzFeed and Huffington Post
Feng Wang, PhD - Founding Engineer of Pure Storage
Sage Weil, PhD 2007, founder of Ceph
Susan Wojcicki, MS – CEO of YouTube

Economics
 Andréa M. Maechler, PhD - Swiss Economist. The first woman to join the board of directors of the Swiss National Bank
 Alvaro Rojas - Economist in IMF board. He represented Argentina, Bolivia, Chile, Paraguay, Peru and Uruguay 
 Zhang Tao, PhD - Deputy Managing Director of the IMF who represents China

Entertainment and broadcasting
Lorin Ashton, aka Bassnectar – free-form electronic music artist and DJ
Juliet Bashore, BA English Literature/Film, award-winning filmmaker (Kamikaze Hearts, The Battle of Tuntenhaus) 
Jello Biafra, singer and songwriter of the Dead Kennedys
Matt Bettinelli-Olpin, BA, filmmaker (V/H/S, Southbound) and guitarist for Link 80
Brannon Braga – award-winning film writer for Star Trek Generations and an executive producer of 24
Bill Carter, BA Politics, Economics – documentary film director and author
Rick Carter, BA, Oscar-winning art director and production designer
John Craigie, BA Mathematics 2002 – folk singer
Dennis Delaney, BA Anthropology 1976 – writer and actor
Brett Dennen – singer, songwriter
Jacob Aaron Estes, BA 1994 – film screenwriter and director
Sven Gamsky, aka Still Woozy BA 2014 – musician, songwriter
Anne Flett-Giordano, BA 1976 – television writer and producer (Kate & Allie, Frasier, Desperate Housewives)
Cary Joji Fukunaga, BA 1999 – Award-winning filmmaker and showrunner (Sin Nombre, True Detective, Beasts of No Nation)
Matthew Gray Gubler, BA – actor (Criminal Minds') and director
Richard Gunn, BA 1997 – actor (Dark Angel, Granite Flats, and For the Love of Money)
Richard Harris – National Public Radio science reporter
Antony Hegarty – attended in late 1980s – Composer and singer for Antony and the Johnsons, and visual artist
Alice Inoue – former television presenter and author
Ethan Klein, BA English Literature 2009 – YouTube video blogger and satirist known for h3h3ProductionsElissa Knight, BA Theater & English Literature 1997 - voice actress
Victor Krummenacher – bassist for Camper Van Beethoven, Monks of Doom
Gretchen Lieberum – singer, songwriter
David Lowery, BA 1984 – singer and songwriter for Camper Van Beethoven and Cracker
Camryn Manheim, BA 1984 – actress
Barry Mendel – film producer (Rushmore, Sixth Sense, Munich, Funny People)
Stephen Mirrione, BA – Academy Award-winning film editor
Dacoury Natche, aka DJ Dahi – Grammy nominated Hip-hop producer
Bradley Nowell, singer and songwriter with Sublime
Marti Noxon, BA – TV producer
Joe Palca, PhD 1982 – National Public Radio science reporter
Jack Passion, BA 2006 – competitive beard grower and star of IFC's Whisker WarsStephanie Foo, BA 2008 – Radio producer for This American Life.
Rebecca Romijn – supermodel, actress
Maya Rudolph, BA 1995 – SNL cast member
Andy Samberg, BA – Saturday Night Live cast member
Tim Schafer – game designer for LucasArts and founder of Double Fine Productions
Akiva Schaffer, BA – Saturday Night Live writer, filmmaker
Stuart Schuffman, aka Broke-Ass Stuart, BA 2003 – travel writer, poet, host of IFC's Young Broke & BeautifulAmber Sealey, BA - film director and actress
Jonathan Segel, BA 1985 – composer, multi-instrumentalist for Camper Van Beethoven
Nikki Silva, BA 1973 – one half of The Kitchen Sisters, who are regularly featured on NPR
Julie Snyder, BA 1995 – producer of NPR's Serial (podcast) and S-TownChris Tashima – actor, Academy Award-winning filmmaker
Jesse Thorn, BS – host of NPR's Bullseye with Jesse Thorn and co-host of Jordan, Jesse, Go!Omi Vaidya - American actor in Bollywood films known for role in 3 Idiots
Rubén Valtierra, BA – keyboardist for "Weird Al" Yankovic
Ally Walker, BS – actress known for roles in Profiler, Sons of Anarchy, and The ProtectorGillian Welch, BA 1990 – singer and songwriter
Kennedy Ashlyn Wenning, musician under the name SRSQ
Rich Wilkes, BA 1988 – writer, filmmaker (Billy Madison, Stoned Age, Beer Money, XXX, Airheads)

Law
Nate Cardozo, BA 2003 – privacy and civil rights attorney, currently managing privacy at WhatsApp
Vince Girdhari Chhabria, BA 1991 – judge, United States District Court for the Northern District of California
Joan E. Donoghue, BA 1978 – judge, International Court of Justice
Ricardo García, BA 1991 – public defender for Los Angeles County
Rachel Goslins, BA 1991 – copyright attorney, Director of the Smithsonian's Arts and Industries Museum, former executive director of the President's Committee on the Arts and Humanities
Charles Harder, BA 1991 – entertainment and civil lawyer known for representing President Donald Trump, Melania Trump, and many celebrities.
Ellen Leonida, BA 1993 – defense attorney for Scott Dyleski

Politics and public life
Jamus Lim, MA 2006, PhD 2006 – Member of the 14th Parliament of Singapore, member of the opposition Workers’ Party of Singapore and associate professor at ESSEC Business School
Bettina Aptheker, PhD – leader in the Berkeley Free Speech Movement
Claire Pierangelo, BA 1982 — Current US Ambassador to the Republic of Madagascar and Union of Comoros
Katherine Canavan, BA –  former United States Ambassador to Botswana and United States Ambassador to Lesotho
Rebecca Cokley, BA – Former director of the Disability Justice Initiative at the Center for American Progress (CAP)
John Doolittle, BA 1972 – Member, U.S. House of Representatives, California's 4th Congressional District
Eli Erlick, PhD – writer, transgender activist, founder of Trans Student Educational Resources
Ron Gonzales, BA – Mayor of San Jose, California, 1999–2006
Victor Davis Hanson, BA 1975 – Senior Fellow at the Hoover Institution
James Charles Kopp, BA Biology 1976 – murderer of Buffalo abortion doctor Barnett Slepian in 1998; convicted in 2003 and serving sentence of 25 years to life
John Laird, BA 1972 – California Natural Resources Agency Secretary, former California Assemblyman, and Mayor of Santa Cruz
Don Lane, former mayor of Santa Cruz, California
Azadeh Moaveni, BA – journalist and writer
Huey P. Newton, BA 1974, PhD 1980 – Co-founding member of the Black Panther Party
Aaron Peskin, San Francisco Board of Supervisors member
Drummond Pike, BA 1970 – Tides Foundation founder, philanthropist, and social entrepreneur
Art Torres, BA 1968 – California Democratic Party Chairman, former California State Senator

Science
Richard Bandler, MA 1975 – co-creator of neuro-linguistic programming
Joseph DeRisi, BA 1992 – molecular biologist, professor at UC San Francisco, MacArthur Fellow, known for work on SARS and malaria
Alan Dressler, PhD 1976, staff astronomer at the Carnegie Institution for Science, member of the National Academy of Sciences, cosmologist, author
J. Doyne Farmer, PhD 1981 – pioneer in chaos theory, Prediction Company, Santa Fe Institute
Debra Fischer, PhD 1998, Professor of Astronomy at Yale University, planet finder
Yoav Freund, PhD 1993 – computer scientist, professor at University of California, San Diego, inventor of AdaBoost
John Grinder, PhD 1971 – linguist, co-creator of neuro-linguistic programming
Howard Hang, BS 1998 – Professor of Chemistry at Rockefeller University
Steven Hawley, PhD 1977 – astronaut, Professor of Physics at the University of Kansas
Holly Jones, BS – restoration ecologist and conservation biologist, associate professor at Northern Illinois University
Stacy Jupiter, PhD 2003 — Director of the Melanesia Program for the Wildlife Conservation Society, MacArthur Fellows Program
Geoffrey Marcy, PhD 1982 – Professor of Astronomy at UC Berkeley,  planet finder, and member of the National Academy of Sciences
Lara Mahal, BA 1996 – Professor of Chemistry at New York University
Marc Okrand, BA 1972 – linguist, creator of the Klingon language
Julie Packard, BA 1974, MA 1978 — Founder and executive director of the Monterey Bay Aquarium
Mark M. Phillips, PhD 1978 – staff astronomer at Las Campanas Observatory, inventor of the Phillips relationship, pioneer in supernova cosmology
Rob Shaw, PhD 1980 – MacArthur Award for work on chaos theory, 1988
Pamela Silver, BA 1974 – Professor of Systems Biology at Harvard Medical School, first Director of Harvard University Systems Biology Graduate Program, synthetic biologist
Deborah Steinberg, PhD 1973 – biological oceanographer, Antarctic researcher
Kathryn D. Sullivan, BS 1973 – astronaut, science museum CEO (COSI Columbus), Under Secretary of Commerce for Oceans and Atmosphere, NOAA Administrator
Nicholas B. Suntzeff, PhD 1980 – Professor of Astronomy at Texas A&M University; cosmologist; co-founder of High-Z Supernova Search Team, which discovered dark energy
Bill Woodcock, BA 1993, - best known for his 1989 origination of the anycast routing technique that is now ubiquitous in Internet content distribution networks and the domain name system

Sports
Anton Peterlin – soccer player

Notable faculty
Martin Abadi - Professor Emeritus, Computer Science and Engineering. Known for Burrows–Abadi–Needham logic and Baby Modula-3
Ralph Abraham – professor emeritus of mathematics, notable for founding the Visual Mathematics Institute and for his pioneering work on chaos theory
Bettina Aptheker – professor of feminist studies and history
Elliot Aronson – professor emeritus of psychology; author of The Social Animal and Nobody Left to Hate: Teaching Compassion after Columbine; creator of the Jigsaw Classroom model; one of the few psychologists to win the American Psychological Association's highest honor in all three fields
John Backus – late adjunct professor of Computer Science; Won Turing Award for creating Fortran
Reyner Banham – late professor of art history and a preeminent architectural historian, in particular of the modern era
Tom Banks – professor of physics. Known for work on string theory, elementary particle physics, and cosmology
Gregory Bateson – late lecturer and fellow of Kresge College; anthropologist, social scientist, linguist, visual anthropologist, semiotician and cyberneticist
George R. Blumenthal – professor of astronomy and  astrophysics, and chancellor of the University of California, Santa Cruz
Bakthan Singaram – professor of organic chemistry and former researcher 
Norman O. Brown – late professor emeritus of humanities
William L. Burke – late professor of physics (cosmologist); chaos theory "godfather"
James H. Clark – assistant professor of information science, founder of Silicon Graphics and Netscape
James Clifford – professor of history of consciousness, known for publications of postmodernist and postcolonial interpretations of anthropology and ethnography
David Cope – professor of music; notable for his experiments in A.I. and computer-created musical compositions
Angela Davis – professor of history of consciousness, writer, activist
Nathaniel Deutsch – professor and Baumgarten Endowed Chair in Jewish Studies  
John Dizikes – professor emeritus of American studies, author, won the 1993 National Book Critics Circle Award
Frank Drake – professor emeritus of astronomy and astrophysics; proposed the Drake Equation; member of the AAAS (elected 1974)
William Everson – late lecturer and poet-in-residence
Sandra M. Faber – professor of astronomy and astrophysics; instrumental in inventing cold dark matter theory and fundamental work in the field of galaxy formation and evolution; member of the NAS (elected 1985), the AAAS (elected 1989), and the American Philosophical Society (elected 2001)
Alison Galloway – forensic anthropologist who worked in identifying the physical remains of Laci Peterson in the Scott Peterson Trial 
Shelly Grabe – associate professor of social psychology and scholar-activist in women's human rights
Craig Haney – professor of psychology and instrumental researcher in the Stanford Prison Experiment
Donna Haraway – professor of history of consciousness; doctorate in biology; often-cited author of feminist history of science and culture studies of cyborg
David Haussler – professor of biomolecular engineering; he and his team assembled the public draft human genome and developed the Genome Browser as part of the Human Genome Project; member of the AAAS (elected 2006)  and the National Academy of Sciences
George Herbig – emeritus professor of astronomy and astrophysics, pioneer in the study of star formation, discoverer of the Herbig Ae/Be stars and Herbig-Haro Objects, member of the National Academy of Sciences
George Hitchcock – late lecturer, poetry and theater
David A. Huffman – deceased; founding faculty of the Information and Computer Science Board; developed Huffman coding
Harry Huskey – deceased; Professor of Computer Science; advised many countries on how to establish an academic Computer Science program
Frederic Jameson – professor of history of consciousness; cultural critic and theorist of the post-modern; published the essay "Postmodernism, or, the Cultural Logic of Late Capitalism", a significant investigation into contemporary culture and the political economy
Jim Kent – associate research scientist in the Department of Biomolecular Engineering; directs the genome browser development and quality assurance staff of the UCSC Genome Bioinformatics Group; created the computer program that assembled the first working draft of the human genome sequence; participates in the public consortium efforts to produce, assemble, and annotate genomes
Robert P. Kraft – professor of astronomy and astrophysics, stellar astronomer, member of the National Academy of Sciences
Cynthia Ling Lee – professor of theatre arts, known for postmodern and classical Indian dance
Tom Lehrer –  lecturer in American studies and mathematics; known for his satire and songwriting
Darrell Long – professor of computer science and engineering, fellow of the Institute of Electrical and Electronics Engineers (IEEE) and the American Association for the Advancement of Science (AAAS)
Chip Lord – professor of film and digital media; member of Ant Farm, a groundbreaking, experimental art and architecture collective he founded in 1968 with fellow architect Doug Michels
Nathaniel Mackey – poet and editor
Dominic W. Massaro – professor of psychology and computer engineering; originator of the fuzzy logical model of perception, one of the leading theories of speech perception
Claire Ellen Max – professor of astronomy and astrophysics, member of the AAAS (elected 2002) and the National Academy of Sciences
Gordon Mumma – professor emeritus of music, composer
Richard Abel Musgrave – member of the American Academy of Arts and Sciences (elected 1961)
Jerry Nelson – professor of astronomy and astrophysics; pioneered the use of mirror segments, making the Keck telescopes possible; member of the NAS
Harry Noller – professor of biology. RNA research; member of the American Academy of Arts and Sciences (elected 1969) and the National Academy of Sciences (elected 1992)
Donald E. Osterbrock – member of the American Academy of Arts and Sciences (elected 1968) and the National Academy of Sciences (elected 1966)
Micah Perks – fiction writer and memoirist
Larry Polansky – professor of music, composer and performing artist
Joel Primack – professor of physics, noted cosmologist; renowned for Cold Dark Matter Theory proposed along with Sandra Faber (see above) and Sir Martin Rees
Geoffrey Pullum – professor of linguistics and distinguished professor of humanities; co-author of Cambridge Grammar of the English Language''; member of the American Academy of Arts and Sciences (elected 2003)
Adrienne Rich – late professor, poet and essayist
Constance M. Rockosi – chair of the astronomy and astrophysics department
Page Smith – Historian
Michael Ellman Soule – member of the American Academy of Arts and Sciences (elected 2005)
Ben Stein – former professor of economics, more notable for his work as a comedian, actor and political commentator
Stephen Thorsett – professor of astronomy and astrophysics; dean of physical and biological science; known for work on properties of compact stars
Anna Tsing – professor of anthropology; Guggenheim Fellow and Niels Bohr Professorship
Noah Wardrip-Fruin – associate professor of computer science, digital media and interactive fiction researcher
Manfred K. Warmuth - Professor of Computer Science, known for Weighted Majority Algorithm
Hayden White – member of the American Academy of Arts and Sciences (elected 1991)
Jim Whitehead – chair of Computer Science and creator of WebDAV
Harold Widom – member of the American Academy of Arts and Sciences (elected 2006)
Stanford E. Woosley – professor of astronomy and astrophysics; noted for his work on supernova gamma ray bursts; member of the NAS (elected 2006) and American Academy of Arts and Sciences (elected 2001)
Karen Tei Yamashita – author and playwright, recipient of the National Book Award's Medal for Distinguished Contribution to American Letters in 2021

Notes and references

 
 
 
Santa Cruz people